Still Country is the forty-first solo studio album by American country music singer-songwriter Loretta Lynn, released on September 12, 2000, by Audium Records and Koch Records. It was Lynn's first commercial studio album in over a decade, since 1988's Who Was That Stranger.

The album was re-released in 2004 with a bonus DVD that features 2 music videos for "Country in My Genes".

Track listing

Personnel
Matraca Berg - backing vocals
Dan Dugmore - electric guitar, steel guitar
Glen Duncan - fiddle, mandolin
Stuart Duncan - fiddle
Steve Gibson - electric guitar
John Hobbs - mandolin, piano, synthesizer
Carolyn Dawn Johnson - backing vocals
Paul Leim - drums, percussion
Loretta Lynn - lead vocals
Lloyd Maines - steel guitar
Liana Manis - backing vocals
Ron "Snake" Reynolds - percussion
Earl Scruggs - banjo
Randy Scruggs - banjo, 12-string guitar, acoustic guitar
Dennis Wilson - backing vocals
Glenn Worf - acoustic bass guitar, bass guitar, upright bass
Chris Young - backing vocals
Curtis Young - backing vocals

Chart performance

References

2000 albums
Loretta Lynn albums
E1 Music albums